Thornbury and Yate is a constituency represented in the House of Commons of the UK Parliament since the 2015 election by Luke Hall, a member of the Conservative Party.  Encompassing an area to the north-east of Bristol, it is one of three constituencies that make up the South Gloucestershire Unitary Authority Area, along with Filton and Bradley Stoke and Kingswood.

History 
This seat is a successor to the former Northavon constituency, which was abolished following boundary changes taking effect at the 2010 general election. It is named after the two largest towns in the constituency: Thornbury and Yate.

The constituency was one of a significant number gained from the Liberal Democrats by the Conservatives in the 2015 general election, and their majority further increased to more than 12,000 in the 2017 election, even as the Conservatives saw a net loss of seats nationally.

Boundaries 

Following the Fifth Periodic Review of Westminster constituencies by the Boundary Commission this newly defined seat emerged. The electoral wards used in the creation of this new seat were all from the district of South Gloucestershire and were as follows:

 Alveston
Boyd Valley (includes Marshfield, Pucklechurch and Wick)
 Charfield
 Cromhall
 Chipping Sodbury
Cotswold Edge (includes Hawkesbury Upton and Acton Turville)
 Dodington
 Frampton Cotterell
 Ladden Brook (includes Wickwar)
 Severn – Aust
 Thornbury North
 Thornbury South
 Westerleigh
 Yate Central
 Yate North
 Yate West

Ward names and boundaries were subsequently reconfigured by the South Gloucestershire (Electoral Changes) Order 2018 which came into effect in 2019.

Constituency profile 
Workless claimants, registered jobseekers, were in November 2012 significantly lower than the national average of 3.8%, at 1.8% of the population based on a statistical compilation by The Guardian.

Members of Parliament

Elections

Elections in the 2010s

See also 
List of parliamentary constituencies in Avon
List of parliamentary constituencies in Gloucestershire

Notes

References

Parliamentary constituencies in South West England
Politics of South Gloucestershire District
South Gloucestershire District
Constituencies of the Parliament of the United Kingdom established in 2010